James Homer Bartley Sr. (February 28, 1900 – May 2, 1972), born "Homer Robert Bartley" and known as Homer "Hop" Bartlett, was an American baseball pitcher in the Negro leagues. A native of Boone County, Missouri, he played with the Indianapolis ABCs and Kansas City Monarchs in 1924 and 1925. Bartlett died in Columbia, Missouri, in 1972 at age 72.

References

External links
 and Seamheads 

1900 births
1972 deaths
Indianapolis ABCs players
Kansas City Monarchs players
Baseball pitchers